These are the units and commanders who fought for the Confederacy in the Battle of Pea Ridge. The Pea Ridge Union order of battle is shown separately.

Abbreviations used

Military rank

 MG = Major general
 BG = Brigadier general
 Col = Colonel
 Ltc = Lieutenant colonel
 Maj = Major
 Cpt = Captain
 Lt = Lieutenant

Other

 w = wounded
 mw = mortally wounded
 k = killed
 c = captured
 - = not reported, unknown

Army of the West

Maj. Gen. Earl Van Dorn

Right Wing

Left Wing (Missouri State Guard)
MG Sterling Price (w)

At the beginning of 1862, Price commanded about 8,000 soldiers. About half of these soldiers were organized as the 1st, 2nd, and 3rd Missouri Brigades while the rest remained in seven Missouri State Guard "Divisions" that were hardly larger than regiments.

See also
 Indian cavalry

Notes
Footnotes

Citations

References

External links
 Pea Ridge National Military Park website (Order of Battle)

American Civil War orders of battle
Arkansas in the American Civil War